The 2001 Big 12 Championship Game was a college football game played on Saturday, December 1, 2001, at Texas Stadium in Irving. This was the 6th Big 12 Championship Game and determined the 2001 champion of the Big 12 Conference. The game featured the Colorado Buffaloes, champions of the North division, and the Texas Longhorns, champions of the South division. Both teams had faced each other earlier in the regular season, with the Longhorns defeating the Buffaloes 41–7. However in the rematch in the championship game, Colorado would narrowly defeat them 39–37 and secure the Big 12 title.

Teams

Colorado

Texas

Game summary

Statistics

References

Championship Game
Big 12 Championship Game
Colorado Buffaloes football games
Texas Longhorns football games
American football in the Dallas–Fort Worth metroplex
December 2001 sports events in the United States
2001 in sports in Texas